Abary (DE) (foaled 1980, died 2002) was a Thoroughbred racehorse (blk/br.), by Roi Dagobert (FR) out of Antioquia, a half-sister to Acatenango. He was twice winner of the Grosser Preis von Berlin (1983, 1984), trained by Heinz Jentzsch.  The owner and breeder was Gestüt Fährhof.

In addition to his victories in the Group 1 Grosser Preis von Berlin he also won the Group 2 Großer Preis der Badischen Wirtschaft twice (1983, 1984) and was placed in other Group 1 and 2 races in Germany and abroad.  Ridden by Maurice Philipperon he ran in the 1984 Prix de l'Arc de Triomphe, finishing 17th behind Sagace, Northern Trick and All Along.
	
He stood at stud in Germany and France. He died in 2002 from colic.

References

External links
 Pedigree Online database - Abary pedigree, partial racing statistics - n.b some of the racing career information appears to be inaccurate
 Deutsche Pferde im Prix de l' Arc de Triomphe (German Horses in the Arc de Triomphe ...)
 Grosser Preis von Berlin 1984, Abary vs At Talaq
 Großer Preis der Badischen Wirtschaft, Abary vs Ordos

1980 racehorse births
Racehorses bred in Germany
Racehorses trained in Germany
Thoroughbred family 11-a